The 2009 NWT/Yukon Scotties Tournament of Hearts (Canada's women's territorial curling championship) will be held January 29 – February 1 at the Whitehorse Curling Club in Whitehorse, Yukon. The winner represents team Northwest Territories/Yukon at the 2009 Scotties Tournament of Hearts in Victoria, British Columbia.

Teams

* Skips, but throws lead stones

Final round-robin standings

Results

Draw 1
January 29, 1400

Draw 2
January 30, 0930

Draw 3
January 30, 1400

Draw 4
January 31, 1300

Draw 5
January 31, 1800

Draw 6
February 1, 0900

External links
Official site

Yukon nwt
Curling in Yukon
2009 in Yukon